SS Tauric was an ocean liner built in 1891 by Harland and Wolff for the White Star Line and completed on 16 May 1891. Though designed as a livestock carrier, Tauric carried a small amount of cabin-(second-) and steerage-(third-) class passengers. Her maiden voyage began at Liverpool and ended at New York. After this, Tauric began running the Liverpool to Portland, Maine route. In 1903, the White Star Line had the ship chartered to the Dominion Line, now taking on the name Welshman. The Dominion Line in turn transferred her to the Leyland Line in 1921. She was scrapped eight years later, in 1929.

References

1891 ships
Ships of the White Star Line
Ships built by Harland and Wolff
Ships built in Belfast
Livestock transportation vehicles